The following is a summary of Donegal county football team's 2019 season.

Neil McGee equalled Colm McFadden's record of 173 appearances for Donegal when he came on as a second half substitute in the final round of the 2019 National Football League, a victory over Kildare. He then broke McFadden's record with his 174th appearance for his county against Meath as a substitute in the final at Croke Park, also won by Donegal.

The 2019 season started with a 0-21 to 0-11 defeat of Queen's in the 2019 Dr McKenna Cup at MacCumhail Park on 30 December 2018. Ciarán Thompson was man of the match and scored four of Donegal's points.

Two players started all 18 matches in 2019: these were Jamie Brennan and Hugh McFadden. Niall O'Donnell played each match too, though only as a substitute in the championship meeting with Fermanagh. Paul Brennan only missed one of the eighteen games, though he began just five of these. Jason McGee played in all matches except for the 2019 National Football League fixture with Cork, which he missed due to suspension.

Personnel changes
Oisín Gallen became an "impact sub" during the championship; this was despite him not being part of the Donegal panel at the start of the 2019 season. He was called up over the course of the McKenna Cup as Donegal were short on numbers.

Aaron Doherty began training with the panel in April, shortly after Eoghan McGettigan joined.

Cian Mulligan opted to depart from the panel. Conor Morrison played six games in the 2019 season before deciding to depart in March. In March, Martin McElhinney informed the team manager of his decision to withdraw from the panel, following the team's victory against Armagh in the 2019 National Football League. McElhinney had been an unused substitute in that game and the game before, though he had played in three earlier games of that year's league. In April, Martin O'Reilly withdrew from the panel ahead of the 2019 Ulster Senior Football Championship after experiencing limited match time during the 2019 National Football League.

Also opting to depart for the 2019 season were Kilcar trio Mark McHugh, Ciaran McGinley and Stephen McBrearty. Following the death of a clubmate in a car accident in January 2019, Odhrán Mac Niallais opted out of the Donegal panel.

Michael Carroll returned to the panel after leaving the previous year.

Competitions

Dr McKenna Cup

National Football League Division 2

Donegal qualified for the Division 2 Final, which they won.

Table

Reports

Ulster Senior Football Championship

Donegal retained the Ulster title.

Bracket

Reports

All-Ireland Senior Football Championship

All-Ireland Quarter-Finals Group 1 table

Reports

Management team
Confirmed in November 2017, with replacements noted:
Manager: Declan Bonner
Assistant manager: Paul McGonigle, not listed among November 2017 appointments
Head coach: John McElholm
Coach: Gary Boyle
Selector: Stephen Rochford, replacing Karl Lacey after 2018 season but Lacey actually carried on until the end of 2020
Goalkeeping coach: Andrew McGovern
Strength and conditioning coach: Paul Fisher
Nutritionist: Ronan Doherty
Team physician: Kevin Moran
Physio: Cathal Ellis
Psychology and performance manager: Anthony McGrath, previously involved with the minor team
Video analysis: Chris Byrne
Logistics: Packie McDyre
Kitman: Barry McBride

Awards

All Stars
Michael Murphy won an All Star. Shaun Patton, Stephen McMenamin, Ryan McHugh, Jamie Brennan and Patrick McBrearty were also nominated.

County breakdown
 Dublin = 7
 Kerry = 4
 Tyrone = 2
 Mayo = 1
 Donegal = 1

Footballer of the Year
Michael Murphy

References

 "Rampant Donegal set new standard in Ulster", analysis by Martin Clarke for BBC Sport

Donegal
Donegal county football team seasons